George Druce (10 May 1821 – 15 April 1869) was an English barrister. He was educated at Shrewsbury School and as a cricketer he played one first-class cricket match for Cambridge University against Marylebone Cricket Club (MCC) at Lord's in 1842. Druce scored five runs in his only first-class appearance.

His nephew Frank Druce played Test cricket for England, while two other nephews Walter Druce and Eliot Druce both played first-class cricket.

Druce had a very successful academic career at Cambridge University and became a prominent and highly respected lawyer. He was appointed a Queen's Counsel in 1866. He died at Denmark Hill, Surrey on 15 April 1869 when he fell from his horse.

Notes

External links

1821 births
1869 deaths
Cricketers from Greater London
People educated at Shrewsbury School
Alumni of Peterhouse, Cambridge
English cricketers
Cambridge University cricketers
Members of Lincoln's Inn
19th-century King's Counsel
Deaths by horse-riding accident in England